Lackerbaueria is a genus of mites in the family Acaridae.

Species
 Lackerbaueria errans Ashfag & Sarwar, 1999
 Lackerbaueria fatigo Sarwar, 2000
 Lackerbaueria lahoriensis Ashfaq, Mustafa-Aheer, Chaudhri & Majid, 1988

References

Acaridae